Suzanne L. Weekes is a professor of Mathematical Sciences at Worcester Polytechnic Institute (WPI). She is a cofounder of the Mathematical Sciences Research Institute Undergraduate Program.

In 2020 she was named executive director of the Society for Industrial and Applied Mathematics.

Education 
Weekes is Caribbean-American, and was born and raised in Trinidad and Tobago. She graduated in 1989 from Indiana University with a major in mathematics and a minor in computer science. She went on to get an MS in applied mathematics in 1990 and a PhD in Mathematics and scientific computing in 1995 at the University of Michigan.

Career
Weekes is the co-director of the Preparation for Industrial Careers in Mathematical Sciences, which helps faculty in the U.S. engage their students with Industrial math research. She is a professor of mathematical sciences at Worcester Polytechnic Institute as well as a cofounder of MSRI-UP, a research experience for undergraduates that aims to increase under represented groups in math programs by providing them with research opportunities. In July 2019, she became Interim Associate Dean of Undergraduate Studies at WPI. In December 2019, she was elected to the executive committee of the Association for Women in Mathematics as an at large member.

Awards and recognition 
In 2015, Weekes received the Denise Nicoletti Trustees' Award for Service to Community. Weekes was recognized by Mathematically Gifted & Black as a Black History Month 2017 Honoree. She received the 2019 M. Gweneth Humphreys Award for mentorship from the Association for Women in Mathematics. She won the Deborah and Franklin Tepper Haimo Award for Distinguished College or University Teaching of Mathematics from the Mathematical Association of America in 2020. She was honored as the 2022 AWM-MAA Etta Zuber Falconer Lecturer.

References 

Trinidad and Tobago scientists
Trinidad and Tobago women scientists
American women mathematicians
Living people
Year of birth missing (living people)
African-American mathematicians
20th-century American mathematicians
21st-century American mathematicians
20th-century women mathematicians
21st-century women mathematicians
University of Michigan alumni
20th-century African-American women
20th-century African-American people
21st-century American women
21st-century African-American women
21st-century African-American people